The Acton Free Press was a weekly newspaper in Acton, Ontario, published from 1875 to 1984. The paper historically served the communities of Acton and Rockwood, and the surrounding townships of Esquesing, Nassagaweya, Eramosa and Erin.

History 
After having published weekly newspapers in Listowel and then in Guelph over the course of several years, Joseph H. Hacking set out to establish The Acton Free Press in July 1875. On the front page of the first edition, he declared:

Hacking would later sell the Free Press to T. Albert Moore and S.W. Galbraith in 1878, in order to concentrate on his job printing business in Guelph. Galbraith would leave the following year to become a reporter at the Montreal Evening Post, and Moore would then enter into partnership with his brother H.P. Moore.

The Moore partnership would dissolve in June 1879, with H.P. Moore becoming the sole proprietor. An editorial in the following week's issue would note:

H.P. Moore would own the Free Press for many years, and became a well-respected member of the community. He was also an influential member of the Methodist Church, and was instrumental in helping to achieve the later formation of the United Church of Canada. He would enter into partnership with G. Arlof Dills in 1922, and Dills would become sole proprietor in 1927.

Journalistic reputation
Its reputation as a high-quality newspaper was well known, both in respect to reporting and technical achievement. H.P. Moore himself was selected by his peers to become President of the Canadian Press Association in 1892.

It acquired the first Linotype machine in Halton County in 1917, which was still working and used in 1966. That capability would prove useful in April 1918, when the Georgetown Herald building caught fire, gutting the offices and destroying its records and presses, with the press itself crashing through the top floor into the basement. The Free Press stepped in to take over the layout and printing, ensuring that the Herald did not miss an issue.

In 1931, the Toronto Globe observed:

This would continue in future years. In December 1966, the printing plant was converted to offset printing with the installation of a Goss web offset press.

Later years
The Free Press would remain in the ownership of the Dills family until 1978, when it would be sold to Inland Publishing. Inland would be merged with Metrospan Community Newspapers{{efn|a subsidiary of Torstar Corporation}} in 1981 to form Metroland. The newspaper ran until the end of 1984, and has since merged with the Georgetown Independent to form the Independent & Free Press''.

Further reading

Notes and references

Notes

References

External links
The Acton Free Press (1875-1984) - INK/ODW Newspaper archive

1984 disestablishments in Ontario
1875 establishments in Ontario
Defunct newspapers published in Ontario
Defunct weekly newspapers
Newspapers established in 1875
Publications disestablished in 1984
Weekly newspapers published in Ontario